Sedimentitalea todarodis is a Gram-negative, rod-shaped, aerobic and motile bacterium from the genus of Sedimentitalea, which has been isolated from the intestinal tract of the squid Todarodes pacificus from the Sea of Japan in Korea.

References

External links
Type strain of Sedimentitalea todarodis at BacDive -  the Bacterial Diversity Metadatabase

Rhodobacteraceae
Bacteria described in 2016